Carposina gracillima is a moth of the family Carposinidae. It was first described by Lord Walsingham in 1907. It is endemic to the Hawaiian islands of Kauai, Oahu, Molokai, Maui and Hawaii.

The larvae feed in the berries of Styphelia species.

References

Carposinidae
Endemic moths of Hawaii
Moths described in 1907
Taxa named by Thomas de Grey, 6th Baron Walsingham